Diamonds in the Raw is the seventh studio album by the S.O.S. Band, released by Tabu Records in 1989. The album marked the absence of lead singer Mary Davis, who left in 1987 to pursue a solo career. Chandra Currelley became the lead singer. Tragedy struck the band due to the untimely death of saxophonist Billy Ellis shortly before the album's completion.

Track listing

Personnel

S.O.S. Band
Marcus Williams – drums, percussion
Jason Bryant – keyboards, vocals
Chandra Currelley – lead and background vocals
Fredi Grace – lead and background vocals
Bruno Speight – lead guitar
Abdul Raoof – trumpet, lead vocals, backing vocals
Kurt Mitchell – bass

Additional personnel
George Howard – Soprano Saxophone
Curtis Williams – Eban Kelly: Backing Vocals

References

External links
 Diamonds in the Raw at Discogs

1989 albums
Tabu Records albums
The S.O.S. Band albums